CJPT-FM is a radio station broadcasting at 103.7 FM in Brockville, Ontario, Canada. The station, owned by Bell Media, airs an adult hits format branded as Bounce 103.7.

History
The station was originally licensed by the CRTC in 1987 to Eastern Broadcasting, the owner of CFJR. Eastern sold both stations to St. Lawrence Broadcasting before the FM station was launched. St. Lawrence launched the FM station in mid-1988 as classic rock CHXL. The former CHXL brandings were XL-103 and The River.

In 1996, both Brockville stations, as well as sister stations CKLC and CFLY in Kingston, were sold to CHUM Limited. On January 1, 2001, CHUM changed CHXL's call sign and format, adopted the current CJPT calls and began airing a hot adult contemporary format as 103.7 The Point. On July 14, 2003, CJPT flipped to adult hits and rebranded as 103.7 Bob FM.

CHUM was acquired by CTVglobemedia in 2007, and since CTVglobemedia's 2011 breakup, now owned by Bell Media.

As part of a mass format reorganization by Bell Media, on May 18, 2021, CJPT adopted the Bounce branding.

References

External links
 Bounce 103.7
 

JPT
JPT
JPT
Bob FM stations
Mass media in Brockville
Radio stations established in 1987
1987 establishments in Ontario